Borovnice is a municipality and village in Rychnov nad Kněžnou District in the Hradec Králové Region of the Czech Republic. It has about 400 inhabitants.

Administrative parts
Villages of Homole, Přestavlky and Rájec are administrative parts of Borovnice.

History
The first written mention of Borovnice is from 1449.

Notable people
František Marek (1899–1971), architect

Gallery

References

External links

Villages in Rychnov nad Kněžnou District